Philip Cobbold (5 January 1875 – 28 December 1945) was an English cricketer. He played eighteen first-class matches for Cambridge University Cricket Club between 1896 and 1922.

See also
 List of Cambridge University Cricket Club players

References

External links
 

1875 births
1945 deaths
English cricketers
Cambridge University cricketers
Cricketers from Ipswich
Suffolk cricketers
Marylebone Cricket Club cricketers
Gentlemen of England cricketers
Free Foresters cricketers